Pauline Cynthia Wagner (August 18, 1910 – May 2, 2014) was an American actress, dancer and glamour girl who had minor roles in the 1930s and 1940s. She made her debut in King of Jazz in 1930. She was also a founding member of the Screen Actors Guild.

Her first significant role was in College Lovers where she played Frank's girlfriend. She was Fay Wray's understudy in King Kong in 1933. She had small parts in Lady Killer and Mr. Deeds Goes to Town. She worked for Metro-Goldwyn-Mayer and RKO. Her film career ended in 1941.

Death
Wagner, who had resided in Glendale, California since 1968, after retiring opened a baby store and wrote a book, she was married to Alfred J. McCourtney and died on May 2, 2014, aged 103.

References

External links
 
 Pauline Wagner at the American Film Institute
Fay Wray's Stunt Double Remembers the Big Ape NBC Los Angeles interview with Pauline Wagner

1910 births
2014 deaths
Actresses from Oklahoma
American centenarians
American film actresses
Metro-Goldwyn-Mayer contract players
People from Shattuck, Oklahoma
People from La Crescenta-Montrose, California
Women centenarians
21st-century American women